Napier  is a surname with an English, Scottish, French or Polish origin.

The British surname Napier is derived from an occupational name for someone who sold or produced table linen; or for a naperer which was a servant who was responsible for the washing and storage of linen in a medieval household.

By tradition, the Scottish surname was given by William the Lion, King of Scots (reigned 1165-1214) to a younger son of the ancient Earls of Lennox after his prowess in battle, when the king is alleged to have said: “Ye have “nae peer” [i.e. you have no peer, meaning no equal]. This is likely to be an apocryphal story made up to give the surname a more elevated origin than simply deriving from one who provided linen, which made it merely comparable to the surname Draper. In 1625, Sir Archibald Napier of Merchiston, the first Lord Napier, presented an affidavit to the College of Heralds, in which he described this origin of the name Napier, as having been bestowed by the king (probably Alexander II) on one Donald Lennox in recognition for acts of bravery. He states:

The British surname is derived from the Middle English, Old French napier, nappier which is a derivative of the Old French nappe meaning "table cloth". The earliest occurrences of the surname is of a Peter Napier in 1148 in the Winton Domesday; Ralph (le) Naper, le Napier in 1167–71; and Reginald le Nappere in 1225.

The surname can also be a shortened form of the Polish surname Napierala.

People
 Alan Napier (1903–1988), actor who played Alfred the Butler in the television series Batman
 Sir Albert Edward Alexander Napier, (1881–1973), British civil servant, Permanent Secretary to the Lord Chancellor's Department, 1944 - 1954
 Sir Alexander Napier, 2nd Laird of Merchistoun (died c. 1473-4), Scottish administrator, diplomat and member of the Scottish Parliament
 Sir Archibald Napier (1534–1608), Scottish landowner and official, master of the Scottish mint and seventh Laird of Merchiston.
 Archibald Napier, 1st Lord Napier, the 9th Laird Napier of Merchiston (c. 1576–1645), Scottish politician and judge
 Archibald Napier, 2nd Lord Napier (c. 1625–1660), Scottish peer and royalist
 Arthur Sampson Napier (1853-1916), British academic
 Bill Napier (William M. Napier, born 1940), Scottish astronomer and author
 Billy Napier (born 1979), American football coach
 Buddy Napier (Skelton Le Roy "Buddy" Napier), American Major League Baseball pitcher
 Charles Elers Napier (1812–1847), British naval officer
 Charles "Charlie" Edward Napier (1910–1973), Scottish footballer
 Sir Charles James Napier (1782–1853), British general
 Sir Charles Napier (1786–1860), Scottish admiral of the Royal Navy
 Charles Napier (1936–2011), American actor
 Sir Charles Napier Inn, an 18th-century pub in Chinnor, Oxfordshire, England
 Charles Napier (aviator) (1892–1918), World War I flying ace
 David Napier (precision engineer) (1785–1873), Scottish engineer
 David Napier (marine engineer) (1790–1869), Scottish marine engineer
 Diana Napier (1905–1982), British film actor
 Duncan Napier, Victorian botanist and herbalist
 Elma Napier (1892–1973), Scottish-born writer and politician who lived most of her life in the Caribbean island of Dominica
 Findlay Napier (born 1978), Scottish musician, guitarist and songwriter
 Francis Napier, 8th Lord Napier (1758-1823), British peer and army officer
 Francis Napier, 10th Lord Napier and 1st Baron Ettrick (1819 – 1898)
 George Napier (1751–1804), British Army officer
 George Thomas Napier (1784–1855), George Napier's son, also a British Army officer, Governor of the Cape
 George Napper  (1550–1610) or Napier, English Roman Catholic priest and martyr
 Sir Gerrard Napier, 1st Baronet (1606–1673), of Middle Marsh and Moor Crichel in Dorset, English Member of Parliament, Royalists during the English Civil War
 Graham Napier (born 1980), English cricketer
 Henry Edward Napier, another of George Napier's sons, naval officer and historian.
 Ian Napier (aviator), World War I flying ace
 Irene Napier (born 1953), Scottish film and television Make-up artist
 Jack Napier (porn star) (born 1972), American pornographic actor
 James Napier (chemist) (1810–1884), Scottish chemist and antiquarian
 James Napier (actor) (born 1982), New Zealand actor
 James Robert Napier (1821–1879), Scottish engineer, inventor of Napier's diagram
 Jim Napier (born 1938), baseball catcher and manager
 James Napier, "Jimmy Napes", English songwriter, producer and musician
 Jessica Napier (born 1979), New Zealand actress, daughter of Marshall Napier
 John Napier (1550–1617), Scots mathematician (discoverer of logarithms), physicist and astronomer
 John Napier (1859–1939), English clergyman and cricketer
 Sir John Mellis Napier (1882-1976), Chief Justice of South Australia 1942-1967
 John R. Napier (1917–1987), primatologist from the University of London, founder of the Primate Society of Great Britain
 John Napier (born 1944), theatre set designer, recipient of many Tony and Olivier awards
 John Napier (born 1946), Irish-born footballer and manager, notably with Bradford City A.F.C.
 John Napier (born 1946), footballer, birth name Robert John Napier
 John Light Napier (born 1947), U.S. Representative from South Carolina
 John Napier (born 1986), American bobsledder
 Joseph Napier (1804-1882), politician in the United Kingdom 
 Joseph Napier, a station keeper for the United States Lifesaving Service, founder of the lifesaving station at St. Joseph, Michigan, whose name was given to the cutter USCGC Joseph Napier
 Lennox Napier (1928–2020), British Army officer
 Lionel Everard Napier (1888–1957), British tropical physician
 Lonnie Napier (born 1940), American politician from Kentucky
 Macvey Napier (1776–1847), Scottish lawyer, editor of the Encyclopædia Britannica
 Margaret Brisbane, 5th Lady Napier (died 1706), Scottish peer
 Marita Napier (1939–2004), South African operatic soprano
 Mark Napier (1798–1879), Scottish historian
 Mark Napier (born 1957), retired Canadian ice-hockey player
 Mark Napier (born 1961), American internet artist
 Mark Francis Napier, British Member of Parliament for Roxburghshire, 1892–1895
 Marshall Napier, New Zealand actor, father of Jessica Napier
 Montague Stanley Napier (1870–1931), English automobile and aircraft engine manufacturer
 Mick Napier, American actor and director
 Michael Scott Napier (1929–1996), British Roman Catholic priest and senior Oratorian
 Sir Nathaniel Napier (died 1635), of Middlemarsh Hall and Moor Crichel in Dorset, English Member of Parliament
 Sir Nathaniel Napier, 2nd Baronet (1636–1709), English politician, traveller and dilettante.
 Nigel Napier, 14th Lord Napier (born 1930), Scottish soldier and courtier
 Nigel Napier-Andrews (born 1942), British/Canadian TV producer and director
 Oliver Napier (1935-2011), first leader of the Alliance Party of Northern Ireland
 Phillip Morris Napier, American politician in Maine
 Priscilla Napier, English biographer
 Prudence Hero Napier, British primatologist
 Richard Napier (1559 – 1 April 1634) English astrologer and medical practitioner
 Robert Napier (1791-1876), Scottish marine engineer
 Sir Robert Napier (died 1615), English judge, Member of Parliament, Chief Baron of the Exchequer in Ireland
 Sir Robert Napier, 1st Baronet, of Luton Hoo (1560-1637), English merchant
 Sir Robert Napier, 2nd Baronet (c. 1603-1661), his son, Member of Parliament
 Robert Napier (died 1766), British Adjutant-General to the Forces
 Robert Napier, 1st Baron Napier of Magdala (1810-1890), British Field Marshal
 The Robert Napier School, Gillingham, Kent
 Sir Robert Napier, 1st Baronet, of Punknoll (1642–1700)
 Ronald Napier (born 1935), South African cricketer
 Russell Napier (1910–1974), Australian actor
 Shabazz Napier (born 1991), Puerto Rican-American basketball player
 Sheena Napier, British costume designer
 Simon Napier-Bell (born 1939), English music professional, one-time manager of The Yardbirds, Wham! and others
 Sue Napier (born 1948), Tasmanian politician
 Susan Napier, New Zealand novelist
 Susan J. Napier, American professor
 Thomas Napier (builder) (1802–1881), Scottish builder who moved to Australia
 Theodore Napier Scottish Australian who was a leading Scottish nationalist, son of Thomas Napier
 Vice Admiral Sir Trevylyan Dacres Willes Napier (1867–1920), Royal Navy office
 Wilfrid Napier (born 1941), South African cardinal of the Roman Catholic Church
 William Napier, pseudonym for British novelist Christopher Hart (born 1965)
 William Napier (1804–1879), lawyer, newspaper editor (in Singapore), and Lieutenant-Governor of Labuan
 William Napier (1828–1908), winner of the Victoria Cross
 Major-General William Craig Emilius Napier (1818–1903), British Army officer, Governor of the Royal Military College Sandhurst
 William Ewart Napier (17 January 1881 in East Dulwich, Surrey - 6 September 1952 in Washington, D.C.) was an American chess master of English birth
 General Sir William Francis Patrick Napier (1785–1860), British Army officer and military historian
 William Rawdon Napier (1877-1951), Admiral of the Royal Navy

Titles of nobility
 Lord Napier
 Baron Napier of Magdala
 Napier baronets of Luton Hoo, Middle Marsh, Merchistoun, Merrion Square, and Punknoll

Fictional persons
 Carson Napier, fictional hero of Edgar Rice Burroughs Venus series
 Declan Napier, fictional character from the Australian soap opera Neighbours
 India Napier, fictional character from the Australian soap opera Neighbours
 Jack Napier, fictional villain from Batman
 Rebecca Napier, fictional character from the Australian soap opera Neighbours
 Sean Napier, fictional character in Exosquad
 Major Napier, suspect in the film The Hindenburg
 Evelyn Napier, minor character in Downton Abbey
 Edie Napier, shopkeeper in Etrian Odyssey III: The Drowned City

See also 
 Grant Napear - American sports radio host and TV broadcaster in Sacramento, California

References

English-language surnames
Surnames of Lowland Scottish origin
Occupational surnames
English-language occupational surnames